Valley Park may refer to:

Places
 Valley Park, Mississippi
 Valley Park, Missouri
 Valley Park, Oklahoma
 Lea Valley Park
 Valley Park Retail Area
 Valley Park Middle School
 Peace Valley Park
 Yarrow Valley Park
 Broadmeadows Valley Park
 Fox Valley Park District
 Valley Park, Chandler's Ford
 The Valley Park, Newtownabbey, Ulster

See also
 Park Valley